Bob Bryan and Mike Bryan were the defending champions, but chose to compete at the Beijing Summer Olympics instead.

Rohan Bopanna and Eric Butorac won in the final 7–6(7–5), 7–6(7–5), against Travis Parrott and Dušan Vemić.

Seeds

Draw

Draw

External links
 Draw

Doubles